Lena Sophie Oberdorf (born 19 December 2001) is a German footballer who plays as a midfielder for Frauen-Bundesliga club VfL Wolfsburg and the Germany national team.

Career
A versatile player who can play in various positions ranging from centre-back, left-back, defensive midfielder and central midfielder, Oberdorf is considered to be one of the most promising young talents in women's football.

She was born in Gevelsberg. During the 2017 UEFA U-17 Women's Championship, Germany lifted their sixth title and Oberdorf was named the best player of the tournament. At the age of 17, she was selected for the Germany squad for the 2019 FIFA Women's World Cup and has since gone on to establish herself as a starter in the national team. She played for Germany in the UEFA Women's Euro 2022 competition, including the final on 31 July, and was named Young Player of the Tournament.

Personal life
Oberdorf's brother Tim Oberdorf is also a footballer.

Career statistics

Club

International 

Scores and results list Germany's goal tally first, score column indicates score after each Oberdorf goal.

Honours
VfL Wolfsburg
 Frauen-Bundesliga: 2021–22
 DFB-Pokal Frauen: 2020–21, 2021–22
Germany

 UEFA Women's Championship runner-up: 2022

Germany U17
 UEFA U-17 Women's Championship: 2017
Individual

 UEFA Women's Championship Young Player of the Tournament: 2022
 UEFA Women's Championship Team of the Tournament: 2022
 FIFA FIFPRO Women's World 11: 2022

 UEFA Women's Under-17 Championship Best Player: 2017
 Fritz Walter Medal: Gold 2020, Silver 2019, Bronze 2018
IFFHS Women's World Team: 2022

References

External links 
 2017: Lena Oberdorf, UEFA
 Interview mit Marina Hegering und Lena Oberdorf, DFB 7 April 2019
 Lena Sophie Oberdorf Getty

2001 births
Living people
German women's footballers
Women's association football midfielders
Germany women's international footballers
2019 FIFA Women's World Cup players
Frauen-Bundesliga players
SGS Essen players
UEFA Women's Euro 2022 players
VfL Wolfsburg (women) players